Japan participated in the 2014 Asian Para Games in Incheon, South Korea from 18 to 24 October 2014. Athletes from Japan achieved a total of 143 medals (including 38 gold), and finished third at the medal table, one spot behind the host nation South Korea, and two spot behind the defending general champions, China.

References

Nations at the 2014 Asian Para Games
2014 in Japanese sport
Japan at the Asian Para Games